Rev. Joseph Bickersteth Mayor (24 October 1828 – 29 November 1916) was an English professor, classical scholar, and Anglican clergyman.

Early life and education

Mayor was born in Cape Colony while his parents returned from Ceylon. He was the fourth son and eighth child of twelve born to Rev. Robert Mayor (1791–1846) and Charlotte Bickersteth (1792–1846). His mother came from the prominent Bickersteth family and was the sister of Henry Bickersteth, 1st Baron Langdale and Rev. Edward Bickersteth. John E. B. Mayor was his elder brother.

Mayor was educated at Rugby School and St John's College, Cambridge (B.A., 1851; M.A., 1853).

Career
Mayor was ordained as a deacon in 1859 and as a priest the following year. He became a Fellow of St. John's in 1852 and lectured until 1863, and served as a tutor from 1860. He became Headmaster of Kensington Proprietary School (1863–69) before returning to higher education at King's College London, where he was Professor of Classical Literature (1870–79) and of Moral Philosophy (1879–83).

Mayor served as the first editor of the Classical Review  (1887–94), and published and edited several volumes on the classics and philosophy, including Greek for Beginners  Sketch of Ancient Philosophy and Chapters on English Metre. He edited several works by John Grote (his wife's uncle), including Exploratio Philosophica (1865) and the posthumous An Examination of Utilitarian Philosophy (1870) and A Treatise on the Moral Ideals (1876). His theological works included The Epistle of St. James: Greek Text with Introductory Notes and Comments (1892), The Epistle of St. Jude, and The Second Epistle of St. Peter.

Personal life
He married Alexandrina Jessie Grote, daughter of Andrew Grote and niece of historian George Grote, philosopher John Grote, and colonial administrator Arthur Grote. They had two sons, civil servant Robert John Grote Mayor (1869–1947) and Henry Bickersteth Mayor (1870–1948) and twin daughters, author Flora MacDonald Mayor (1872–1932) and Alice MacDonald Mayor (1872–1961).

Teresa Mayor Rothschild (1915–1996), wife of the 3rd Baron Rothschild, was his granddaughter.

References

External links
 Joseph Bickersteth Mayor's manuscripts at Cambridge University
 

1828 births
1916 deaths
People educated at Rugby School
Alumni of St John's College, Cambridge
Fellows of St John's College, Cambridge
Classical scholars of the University of Cambridge
English classical scholars
English male writers
Scholars of Latin literature
Bickersteth family
Academics of King's College London
19th-century English Anglican priests
20th-century English Anglican priests